Eau Claire (French for "clear water") is a city mostly located in Eau Claire County, Wisconsin, of which it is the county seat, and with a small portion in Chippewa County, Wisconsin. It had a population of 69,421 in 2020, making it the state's eighth largest city. Eau Claire is the principal city of the Eau Claire, Wisconsin Metropolitan Statistical Area, locally known as the Chippewa Valley, and is also part of the larger Eau Claire-Menomonie Combined Statistical Area.

Eau Claire is at the confluence of the Eau Claire and Chippewa Rivers on traditional Ojibwe, Dakota, and Ho-Chunk land. The area's first permanent European American settlers arrived in 1845, and Eau Claire was incorporated as a city in 1872. The city's early growth came from its extensive logging and timber industries. After Eau Claire's lumber industry declined in the early 20th century, the city's economy diversified to encompass manufacturing and Eau Claire became an educational center with the opening of the University of Wisconsin–Eau Claire in 1916. Eau Claire is also a regional commercial and business center and home to the headquarters of home improvement store chain Menards.

Eau Claire is known regionally for its arts and music scenes and is the hometown of indie folk band Bon Iver, whose lead singer Justin Vernon co-curates the city's annual Eaux Claires Music & Arts Festival. Eau Claire is the second fastest-growing major city in Wisconsin after Madison, with 5.4% population growth between 2010 and 2020.

Name origin
Eau Claire took its name from Eau Claire County. "Eau Claire" is the singular form of the original French name, "Eaux Claires", meaning "Clear Waters", for the Eau Claire River. According to local legend, the river was so named because early French explorers journeying down the rain-muddied Chippewa River, came upon the confluence with the Eau Claire River, and excitedly exclaimed "Voici l'eau claire!"  ("Here is the clear water!"). Now the city motto, this appears on the city seal.

History 

The Eau Claire area was first visited by Europeans in the late 17th century. It had been occupied for thousands of years before European fur traders began settling there for trade with local Native American tribes.

The First Treaty of Prairie du Chien, signed in 1825, established the Chippewa River "half a day's march below the falls" as the boundary between the Sioux and Chippewa, and the "Clear Water River, a branch of the Chippewa" as the boundary between the Chippewa and Winnebago.

The first permanent European-American settlers arrived in 1845, and the city was officially incorporated in 1872. Extensive timber was harvested and logging was the major industry during this time; many sawmills were built as part of the lumber industry. Sawmills and other manufacturing made Eau Claire an industrial city by the late 19th century.

The city was founded near the confluence of the Eau Claire and Chippewa rivers as three separate settlements. The main section of downtown is on the site of the original European-American village, where Stephen McCann, in partnership with J. C. Thomas, put up three buildings in 1845. Although these structures were erected primarily to establish a claim to the land site, the McCann family moved into one of them and became the first permanent settlers.

West Eau Claire, founded in 1856, was across the river, near the site of the current county courthouse, and was incorporated in 1872. Between a mile and a half and two miles downstream, the Daniel Shaw & Co. lumber company founded Shawtown, beyond the west end of what is now the Water Street historic district. Shawtown was annexed to the city of Eau Claire by the 1930s. By the 1950s, the entire city had spread far enough to the east to adjoin Altoona.

In 1916, the University of Wisconsin–Eau Claire was founded, which marked the turn from a mostly lumber production based economy into one centered around manufacturing, education, and healthcare. 

In 1917, Gillette Safety Tire Company built a large factory in Eau Claire along the Eau Claire River less than a mile where the rivers meet. The factory mainly created rubber tires and tubing. It had about 1,600 workers in 1920, producing almost 500 tires and 500 rubber tubing everyday. These numbers have increased every year since it opened in 1917. In 1931, United States Rubber Company agreed to purchase Gillette, a sale not completed until 1940 owing to the Great Depression. Due to the start of World War II, the US War Department brought the facility in 1942 to use as an ammunition plant. At the height of the war effort, the plant had over 6,000 employees. Toward the end of the war, the government sold the building back to its original owners, and it was quickly converted back to manufacturing tire products. Throughout the decades after the war, the plant received multiple expansions and was renamed Uniroyal in 1967. 

In 1991, Uniroyal, one of the largest factories in Eau Claire at the time, announced it would shutter the facility, ultimately causing 1,358 workers to lose their jobs. Although this factory shutdown was detrimental to Eau Claire's economy, the unemployment rate fell from 1991 to 1992. Today the building, now named Banbury Place, is used as a small business incubator and leased to existing businesses and organizations.

Geography

The city's terrain is characterized by the river valleys, with steep slopes leading from the center to the eastern and southern sections of the city. The lands into which the urban area is expanding are increasingly hilly.

There are two lakes in the city, Dells Pond and Half Moon Lake. Dells Pond is a reservoir created by a hydroelectric dam, and was formerly used as a holding pool for logs. Half Moon Lake is an oxbow lake created as part of the former course of the Chippewa River.

Climate
In the Köppen climate classification, Eau Claire is classified as Dfa/Dfb borderline, usually termed as the subtype of warm, sometimes hot, summer. Its climate is due to its latitude and interior location in North America. The average annual temperature is only . Although the extremes exceed  upwards and −40 °F, which demonstrates the four well-defined seasons of the year, with severe winters generally colder than the winters of European Russia south of Moscow at a much lower latitude. The amount of annual snowfall (47") exceeds the amount of annual rainfall (31"), the total precipitation is greater than other major cities in Wisconsin such as Milwaukee and Madison.

Demographics

2020 census
As of the census of 2020, the population was 69,421. The racial makeup of the city was 85.9% White, 5.7% Asian, 1.5% Black or African American, 0.6% Native American, 0.1% Pacific Islander, 1.1% from other races, and 5.1% from two or more races. Ethnically, the population was 3.3% Hispanic or Latino of any race.

The 2020 census population of the city included 147 people incarcerated in adult correctional facilities and 3,556 people in student housing.

According  to the American Community Survey estimates for 2016-2020, the median income for a household in the city was $59,705, and the median income for a family was $82,851. Male full-time workers had a median income of $48,978 versus $39,147 for female workers. The per capita income for the city was $31,510. About 4.9% of families and 15.5% of the population were below the poverty line, including 11.4% of those under age 18 and 6.7% of those age 65 or over. Of the population age 25 and over, 95.5% were high school graduates or higher and 33.9% had a bachelor's degree or higher.

2010 census

As of the census of 2010, there were 65,883 people, 26,803 households, and 14,293 families residing in the city. The racial makeup of the city was 91.4% White, 4.6% Asian, 1.1% African American, 0.5% Native American, 0.5% from other races, and 1.8% from two or more races. Hispanic or Latino of any race were 1.9% of the population.

There were 26,803 households, of which 25.6% had children under the age of 18 living with them, 39.6% were married couples living together, 9.5% had a female householder with no husband present, 4.2% had a male householder with no wife present, and 46.7% were non-families. 31.7% of all households were made up of individuals, and 10.3% had someone living alone who was 65 years of age or older. The average household size was 2.29 and the average family size was 2.89.

The median age in the city was 29.8 years. 19.3% of residents were under the age of 18; 22.3% were between the ages of 18 and 24; 25.2% were from 25 to 44; 21.7% were from 45 to 64; and 11.7% were 65 years of age or older. The gender makeup of the city was 48.5% male and 51.5% female.

As of 2010, there were 1,981 persons within the city limits in Chippewa County and 63,902 in Eau Claire County for a total of 65,883.

Metropolitan area

The city forms the core of the United States Census Bureau's Eau Claire Metropolitan Statistical Area, which includes all of Eau Claire and Chippewa Counties (composite 2010 population: 161,151). Together with the Menomonie Micropolitan Statistical Area (which includes all of Dunn County) to the west, the Eau Claire metropolitan area, forms the Census Bureau's Eau Claire-Menomonie Consolidated Metropolitan Statistical Area, which had a consolidated 2010 population of 205,008.

Hmong population

As of 2017, Hmong Americans were Eau Claire's largest ethnic minority. Jenna Christian, Pa Sia Low Moua, and Ingolf Vogeler, the authors of "The Cultural Landscape of the Hmong in Eau Claire, Wisconsin", write that the Hmong are also the city's "most visible ethnic group".

In 2010, there were 2,181 Hmong people in Eau Claire County, While the Hmong population is smaller in Eau Claire County than in Milwaukee, the Hmong are a higher percentage of the population in Eau Claire County, and Christian, Moua, and Vogeler write, "the Hmong stand out more singularly as an ethnic minority than they do in metropolitan areas like Milwaukee, which is already more racially and culturally diverse." The majority of the county's Hmong live in the city of Eau Claire. In some Eau Claire neighborhoods, up to 30% of the residents are Hmong.

Economy 

Eau Claire styles itself as the "horseradish capital of the world", due to the presence of Silver Spring Foods, the world's largest grower and producer of horseradish. The climate, with its cool winters, is conducive to the horseradish crop. Other significant crops grown in the area are apples, pumpkins and plums. Menards, a Midwestern chain of home improvement stores owned by Wisconsin native John Menard Jr., is headquartered in Eau Claire.

Arts and culture

Performing arts
Eau Claire has a modest but active theater community. No professional theater groups make their home in the region, but amateur and community theaters have a significant presence; the most visible of these are the Chippewa Valley Theatre Guild (CVTG) and the Eau Claire Children's Theatre (ECCT). In addition, the University of Wisconsin-Eau Claire has a robust theatre program, and traveling professional shows frequently make stops in the city. The Pablo Center at the Confluence and Haas Fine Arts Center are the primary indoor performing arts venues, although both CVTG and ECCT have established their own independent venues, in 2006 and 2010 respectively.

The Pablo Center at the Confluence 

The Pablo Center at the Confluence was opened in downtown Eau Claire on September 22, 2018. It was built to replace UW-Eau Claire's Kjer Theater as the primary venue for performing arts. Facilities include a 1,200-seat theatre, three rehearsal rooms, visual arts galleries, labs for sound and lighting, set and exhibit design, recording arts, multimedia production, and costume design.

Blugold Marching Band 
The Blugold Marching Band is a notable part of the University of Wisconsin-Eau Claire's music program, as well as a fixture of the Eau Claire community. The 475-member ensemble is the largest marching band in the Midwest. The band has gone on multiple tours across the Midwest, and had many performances on the world stage.

Music Festivals 
Eau Claire is home to several music festivals, including:

 Blue Ox Music Festival
 Country Jam
 Decadent Cabaret Music Festival
 Eau Claire Jazz Fest
 Eaux Claires Music & Arts Festival

Eau Claire Marathon 
Eau Claire is home to the Eau Claire Marathon, a Boston Marathon qualifier.

Sculpture Tour 
The Sculpture Tour Eau Claire is an ongoing outdoor sculpture exhibit along the streets of downtown Eau Claire. There are 53 sculptures, making this tour the second-largest of its type in the nation.

Eau Claire Downtown Farmers Market 
The Eau Claire Downtown Farmers Market is in Phoenix Park. It is open from May to October and offers a variety of produce and products.

Museums 

 Chippewa Valley Museum
 Wisconsin Logging Museum
 Dells Mills Museum
 Children's Museum of Eau Claire

Annual events 

 Winter Fest and Games
 Silvermine Ski Invitational
 Banbury Art Crawl
 Jig's Up Ice Fishing Contest
 Wisconsin Sport Show
 Eau Claire Improv Fest
 Viennese Ball
 International Fall Festival
 Gatsby's Gala
 US National Kubb Championship
 UWEC Fire Ball

Sports

Baseball

Eau Claire has four amateur baseball teams. The Eau Claire Express play in the Northwoods League, an NCAA-sanctioned summer baseball league. Its home games are at Carson Park. The Eau Claire Cavaliers also play home games at Carson Park. In addition to the Cavaliers, the Eau Claire Bears and the Eau Claire Rivermen play in the Chippewa River Baseball League. Three of Eau Claire's high schools have baseball teams. Eau Claire North H.S. won the 2011 and 2019 state championship. Eau Claire also has a large youth baseball program, including a summer parks and recreation league, Little League (Nationals, American, Lowes Creek and Seymour). Eau Claire Little League teams have twice won the state championship (1998 Eau Claire Americans and 2012 Eau Claire Nationals) and advanced to Regional play in Indianapolis. A Babe Ruth League (13- to 18-year-olds) won state tournaments at ages 13, 14 and 15 in 2012. Those teams all went on to win 3rd place at their regional tournaments.

Curling

Eau Claire Curling Club has been around for 64 years.

Football

The Chippewa Valley Predators football team competes in the Northern Elite Football League and plays its home games at Carson Park. The team was established in 2001. The Northern Lights Cowboys compete in the Champions Amateur Football League and play their home games at Carson Park.

As of 2023, the Eau Claire Cowboys football team competes in the Northern Lights Football League and plays its home games at Carson Park

Roller Derby

Established in 2009, The Chippewa Valley Roller Girls (CVRG) represent Eau Claire and the surrounding Chippewa Valley region. CVRG, a WFTDA League member, is Eau Claire's original all-female flat track roller derby league. It is a nonprofit organization managed and operated by the skaters via an elected board of directors and skater-led committees.

Soccer

Bateaux FC, an amateur soccer club, is based in the city. The club is a founding member of the Wisconsin Primary Amateur Soccer League (WPASL), a USASA and WSL-sanctioned league operating in western Wisconsin.          

Union Eau Claire FC made their WPASL debut in 2022 joining Bateaux FC as the second WPASL team in the Eau Claire area

Eau Claire United is a competitive youth soccer team competing in the MYSA. Every summer, Eau Claire United hosts a soccer tournament that brings around 100 teams to the community.

Kubb

The U.S. National Kubb Championship is held in Eau Claire annually. The Eau Claire Kubb League operates kubb league year round.

Tennis

The John and Fay Menard YMCA Tennis Center has eight indoor courts and hosts sectional and national tournaments.

Horseshoes 

Eau Claire hosted the 2003 World Horseshoe Championship and the 2029 Wisconsin State Horseshoe Tournament.

Ski jumping

Each January, Eau Claire hosts the Silver Mine ski jump Invitational.

Parks and recreation

Parks and Trails 
There are several large parks in the city: Owen Park, along the Chippewa River, is home to a large bandshell, where open-air concerts are held throughout the summer; Putnam Park, which follows the course of Putnam Creek and Little Niagara Creek east from the UWEC campus; Carson Park, situated in the middle of an oxbow lake (better known as Halfmoon Lake); and Phoenix Park on the site of the old Phoenix Steel plant at the confluence of the Eau Claire and Chippewa Rivers. Phoenix Park hosts a weekly farmers market and open-air concerts during the summer. Riverview Park is a common summer swimming destination and one of the local boat landings. It has picnicking areas, grills, and public restrooms. There are also two dog parks in Eau Claire: Otter Creek Off-Leash Dog Park and Sundet Off-Leash Dog Park.

The City of Eau Claire also operates Fairfax public pool and Hobbs Municipal Ice Center, an indoor ice center.

Eau Claire is at the head of the Chippewa River State Trail, a biking and recreation trail that follows the lower course of the Chippewa River.

Government

In November 1909 a movement to change the city government from the aldermanic to the commission form was launched by the West Side Boosters, the forerunners of the Water Street, Eau Claire Business Men. The campaign that preceded the February 15 election was heated. Local rallies and mass meetings were held. The 20 members of the common council were about equally split about the change. The final vote was 1,867 for change and 995 against.

Since switching from a mayoral system in 1948, Eau Claire has had a city manager-city council form of government. The city council is a nonpartisan 11-member governing council consisting of five members elected from aldermanic districts in odd-numbered years, five members elected at large in even-numbered years, and an elected city council president, elected at large in odd-numbered years.

The council's legislative meetings are held on the second and fourth Tuesday of each month. Public hearings are held on the Monday evenings before legislative sessions. All meetings are held in the City Council Chambers at City Hall in downtown Eau Claire. Meetings are televised live on public-access television channel 97 and digital cable channel 994 and simulcast on radio station WRFP 101.9 FM.

Eau Claire is represented by Ron Kind in the United States House of Representatives, and by Ron Johnson and Tammy Baldwin in the United States Senate. Kathy Bernier and Jeff Smith represent Eau Claire in the Wisconsin State Senate, and Jesse James, Jodi Emerson, and Warren Petryk in the Wisconsin State Assembly.

Education

Eau Claire schools are part of the Eau Claire Area School District. The city has two public high schools: Memorial High School and North High School; and two public charter high schools: McKinley Charter School and Technology Charter School. Eau Claire also has two private high schools: Catholic Regis High School and Immanuel Lutheran High School.

Eau Claire is home to two public colleges (University of Wisconsin–Eau Claire and the Chippewa Valley Technical College) and a private college (Immanuel Lutheran College).

There are 13 elementary schools and three middle schools in the Eau Claire Area School District. In addition, there is the Chippewa Valley Montessori Charter School, which follows the teaching of Maria Montessori.

Media

Print
The Eau Claire Leader-Telegram is published five days a week (the Friday edition has extra weekend content), and dates to 1881. Volume One is a biweekly magazine with a circulation of 15,000 and an estimated readership of 45,000.

Television
Nielson Market Research lists Eau Claire/ La Crosse as the 127th largest television market area.

Cable

Radio
FM

AM

Transportation

Airports
Eau Claire is served by the Chippewa Valley Regional Airport (IATA: EAU, ICAO: KEAU).

Mass transit
 Eau Claire Transit bus lines

Bus
Eau Claire is served by both Greyhound Lines (Milwaukee to Minneapolis, via I-94), and Jefferson Lines Bus service (Green Bay to Minneapolis, via Hwy 29 to I-94).

Major highways

Rail
Eau Claire is on freight rail lines owned by the Union Pacific Railroad, formerly owned by the Chicago, St. Paul, Minneapolis and Omaha Railway (Omaha Road), and later part of the Chicago and North Western Railway. C&NW operated passenger trains from Chicago through Eau Claire to the Twin Cities area until 1963, when the Twin Cities 400 ended service. Eau Claire station opened in 1893 and closed with the end of C&NW service. It was demolished in 1987. Passenger rail service to Eau Claire is seen as critical by the Minnesota Department of Transportation and Wisconsin Department of Transportation, and they plan to return trains to the city by 2030. In March 2021, Amtrak unveiled plans to bring a passenger service to Eau Claire as part of a Milwaukee-to-St. Paul route.

Health care
Mayo Clinic Health System's Eau Claire location, which has a level 2 trauma rating and serves as the regional trauma center, offers a family medicine residency program. It was also named the #4 best hospital in Wisconsin and recognized as a Best Regional Hospital in northwestern Wisconsin. Eau Claire also has two other hospitals with level 3 trauma ratings: HSHS Sacred Heart and Marshfield Medical Center. All three hospitals offer various specialty care units and services.

Libraries 
Eau Claire is home to two libraries: McIntyre Library on the University of Wisconsin-Eau Claire campus and L.E. Phillips Memorial Public Library. L.E. Phillips Memorial Public Library holds many events, such as children's storytimes, book clubs and makerspace labs.

Shopping 
Oakwood Mall is Eau Claire's main mall. It has been open since 1986 and has 91 stores and services. Downtown Eau Claire and Water Street also include a variety of specialty shops, including bike shops, arcades, record shops, and antique stores.

Religion
The Episcopal Diocese of Eau Claire is headquartered in the city. Its mother church is Christ Church Cathedral. The city is also within the Roman Catholic Diocese of La Crosse and is home to Sacred Heart Church and St. Patrick's Church. Additionally, Community House, First Congregational Church, First Methodist Episcopal Church and the Lutheran Church of the Good Shepherd are in Eau Claire.

Eau Claire is home to several religious denominations:

 Apostolic Faith – 1 congregation
 Assemblies of God – 2 congregations
West Ridge Church
Havestime Church
 Baptist – 8 churches variously unaffiliated (including 1 SBC congregation)
Lighthouse Baptist Church
Salem Baptist Church
Calvary Baptist Church
Birch Street Baptist Church
Valleybrook Church
Eau Claire Gospel Center
Baptist Evangelical Church
Grace Baptist Church
 Catholic – 5 parishes
Newman Catholic Parish
Sacred Heart of Jesus- St. Patrick Parish
St. James the Greater
Immaculate Conception
St. Olaf Parish
 Church of Christ and a non-institutional congregation
 Episcopalian – 1 congregation (The Episcopal Diocese of Eau Claire has its see in Eau Claire.)
Christ Church Cathedral
 Hmong Christian Alliance – 1 congregation
 Islam – 1 mosque located in Altoona, WI – The Islamic Society of Northern Wisconsin Mosque or Altoona Masjid
 Jehovah's Witness – 2 congregations (both of which share the same Kingdom Hall)
Kingdom Hall of Jehovah's Witnesses
 Judaism – 1 synagogue (Conservative)
 Lutheran – about 20 congregations representing the following:
Evangelical Lutheran Synod (ELS)
 Evangelical Lutheran Church in America (ELCA)
Grace Lutheran Church
Hope Lutheran Church
Trinity Lutheran Church
 Church of the Lutheran Brethren of America
 Lutheran Church–Missouri Synod (LCMS)
St. Matthew Lutheran Church
 Church of the Lutheran Confession (CLC)
 Wisconsin Evangelical Lutheran Synod (WELS)
St. Johns Lutheran Church
Bethesda Lutheran Church
St. Mark Lutheran Church
Saving Grace Lutheran Church
University Lutheran Church
Concordia Lutheran Church
Lutheran Church of The Good Shepherd
Our Redeemer Lutheran Church
Messiah Lutheran Church and School
Spirit Lutheran
Immanuel Lutheran Church
Faith Lutheran Mission Church
 Methodist – 4 congregations (one of which is located in nearby Altoona)
 Lake Street United Methodist Church
 Mennonite Church USA – 1 congregation meeting two Sundays per month
 The Church of Jesus Christ of Latter-day Saints – 1 congregation
 Nazarene – 1 congregation
 Pentecostal 
Pentecostal Assembly
 Presbyterianism – 2 congregations
First Presbyterian
North Presbyterian
 Society of Friends (Quakers) – 1 congregation
 Salvation Army – 1 congregation
 Unitarian Universalist – 1 congregation
 United Church of Christ – 2 congregations
First Congregational UCC
Plymouth United Church of Christ
 Unity School of Christianity – 1 congregation
 Wesleyan Church – 1 congregation

Notable people

Sister cities
Eau Claire's sister cities are:
 Lismore, Australia
 Miramar District, Costa Rica

See also
 Eau Claire-Chippewa Falls metropolitan area
 Eau Claire, Calgary – a neighborhood in Calgary, Alberta (Canada), whose name was derived from a relocated Eau Claire, WI sawmill.
 List of municipalities in Wisconsin by population
 List of Tree Cities USA

References

Further reading
 
 McArthur, Charles. "Eau Claire, Wisconsin, A City of Opportunities", National Magazine (July 1905)

External links

General

 City of Eau Claire website
 Eau Claire-Chippewa Falls Metropolitan Planning Organization website
 Eau Claire Travel Bureau

History

 Eau Claire Historic Preservation Foundation
 Eau Claire Landmarks Commission photo collection
 University of Wisconsin–Eau Claire Special Collections and Archives 
 L. E. Phillips Memorial Public Library Local History Resources
 Sanborn fire insurance maps: 1883 1885 1889

 
Cities in Wisconsin
Cities in Chippewa County, Wisconsin
Cities in Eau Claire County, Wisconsin
County seats in Wisconsin
Eau Claire–Chippewa Falls metropolitan area